Reginald Roy Rattey, VC (28 March 1918 – 10 January 1986) was an Australian recipient of the Victoria Cross, the highest award for gallantry "in the face of the enemy" that can be awarded to members of the British or Commonwealth armed forces. He was one of 20 Australians to receive the award for their actions during the Second World War, doing so while serving with the 25th Battalion during the Bougainville Campaign in 1945. After the war, Rattey ran a farm near West Wyalong, New South Wales. He died in 1986 at the age of 67.

Early life
Born on 28 March 1918, at Barmedman, in New South Wales, Reg Rattey was one of seven children born to a Lutheran family living in rural New South Wales. His father, Johannes Albert Rattey, who was originally from Springton, South Australia had married his mother, Anna Elisabeth (née Damschke), at Pleasant Hills on 26 February 1914. Reginald was the couple's third child and when he was born, his father was working a  share farm.

In his formative years, Reg was schooled at Bellarwi, travelling by horse  each way, and was a keen sportsman playing cricket, football and tennis. After leaving school, he helped out on the family farm, and found work as a miner; he also joined the Militia, serving as a part-time soldier in the 21st Light Horse Regiment. When the war broke out, he was working at the Gibsonvale Open Cut Tin Mine at Kikoira and was parading with the 21st Light Horse Regiment at Wagga Wagga.

Second World War
In late September 1941, as the prospect of war in the Pacific against the Japanese grew, Rattey's regiment was mobilised for full-time service. The 21st Light Horse was subsequently redesignated as the 21st Reconnaissance Battalion, and Rattey served as a Bren carrier driver and then a driver-mechanic. As a member of the Militia, under the provisions of the Defence Act, Rattey was not allowed to serve outside of Australian territory, but in July 1942 he volunteered for overseas service as part of the Australian Imperial Force. He was transferred to 3rd Division’s carrier company and then the 11th Division, and in September 1943 deployed to New Guinea, remaining there until April 1944 when he returned to Australia as a corporal. Two months later, he was transferred to an infantry battalion, the 25th Battalion, a Militia unit that had been raised in Queensland that was part of the 7th Brigade.

In July 1944, the 25th Battalion deployed to New Guinea where they were based around Madang until November when the battalion was transferred to Bougainville Island, landing at Torokina, where the Australians had taken over from the American force that had previously been fighting a campaign against the Japanese on the island. The Australians then began a three-pronged offensive in the northern, central and southern sectors of the island to clear the Japanese from the island. As part of this offensive, the 25th Battalion initially took part in the fighting in the central sector, and in late December fought in the Battle of Pearl Ridge before joining the southern drive on the Japanese stronghold of Buin in early 1945. By March they had crossed the Puriata River and begun moving inland towards a position that became known as "Slater's Knoll".

Victoria Cross

On 26 July 1945, Rattey was awarded the Victoria Cross for his actions at Buin Road in South Bougainville on 22 March. The 25th Battalion were ordered to capture a Japanese stronghold following an allied air and artillery attack. After determining that an attack by his section would likely incur many casualties, he single-handedly attacked three Japanese weapons bunkers with his Bren gun. After eliminating one of the bunkers with a grenade, he returned to his section through enemy fire to obtain two more grenades and returned to destroy two more enemy bunkers.

Shortly after this, his section advanced and encountered further Japanese machine gun fire. Rattey again launched a solo attack on an enemy gun position, killing one, injuring another and causing the remaining gun crew to retreat. The section captured the Japanese machine gun with 2,000 ammunition rounds before advancing further. Two days after this action, Rattey was promoted to sergeant, and the following month his battalion was relieved shortly after holding off a large-scale Japanese attack during the Battle of Slater's Knoll.

Post war
After returning to Australia, Rattey was briefly hospitalised with a bout of malaria and then briefly toured the country helping to raise money for the Australian Comfort Fund. He was discharged from the Army on 31 October 1945, and began farming a  property around Lake Cowal, near West Wyalong, which he was granted under a special lease. In March 1946, he returned to the Army, being granted the rank of sergeant to attend the Victory Parade in London, where he was presented his Victoria Cross by King George VI at Buckingham Palace. He was discharged from the Army again in September 1946 and returning to Lake Cowal. In 1948, Rattey married Emily Café, with whom he had one daughter. Emily died in 1954 and the following year he remarried, exchanging nuptials with Aileen Delaney at St Mary's Catholic Church, in West Wyalong; the couple would later have four children.

Rattey expanded his property at Lake Cowal by an extra , and eventually worked the land with sheep, cattle, pigs and wheat. Later, he also farmed tiger snakes for their serum. In his later life, Rattey's health deteriorated and he had to give up the land. He died on 10 January 1986 as a result of emphysema and was given a full military funeral at St Mary's Catholic Church, before being interred at the West Wyalong Lawn Cemetery. He was survived by his second wife and his five children.

Honours and awards

In addition to the Victoria Cross, Rattey also received the 1939–1945 Star, the Pacific Star, the War Medal 1939–1945, the Australia Service Medal 1939–1945, the Queen Elizabeth II Coronation Medal and the Queen Elizabeth II Silver Jubilee Medal. He is also commemorated by the following memorials:

 A plaque in the Strand, London, which was one of 12 unveiled during Victory in the Pacific Day celebrations on 29 August 1995;
A memorial cairn in Lions Park, West Wyalong, which was unveiled on 13 November 1992;
 Reg Rattey  Drive, which was opened in West Wyalong, in March 1999;
 A memorial park in Canberra (part of the national Remembrance Driveway); and
A soldiers' club at Larrakeyah Barracks.

References
Footnotes

Citations

Further reading

External links
 
 

1918 births
1986 deaths
Military personnel from New South Wales
Australian Army soldiers
Australian World War II recipients of the Victoria Cross
People from the Central West (New South Wales)
Deaths from emphysema
Australian farmers
Australian Army personnel of World War II